The Slingsby T.49 Capstan is a British two-seat glider of the 1960s built by Slingsby Sailplanes as a replacement for their earlier Type 42 Eagle.  It is a high-winged monoplane of wooden construction, the last two-seat wooden glider built by Slingsby, intended for both training and general club flying.  Side-by-side seats for the two pilots are accommodated in an enclosed cockpit with a one-piece perspex canopy.  The prototype T.49A first flew in 1961, and it entered production as the T.49B in 1963. Thirty-four Capstans were built, one of which was fitted with an auxiliary engine with the designation T.49C Powered Capstan.

Specifications

Notes

References
"Two New Sailplanes". Flight International, 31 May 1962.pp. 867–869.
Taylor, J.W.R (ed.) Jane's All The World's Aircraft 1969–70. London:Sampson Low, 1969.
Slingsby Sailplanes Capstan T49 Handbook, 1963

External links

Photos of Slingsby Capstan
Slingsby Capstan Pictures

1960s British sailplanes
Glider aircraft
Capstan
Aircraft first flown in 1961
High-wing aircraft